NEC SX describes a series of vector supercomputers designed, manufactured, and marketed by NEC. This computer series is notable for providing the first computer to exceed 1 gigaflop, as well as the fastest supercomputer in the world between 1992–1993, and 2002–2004. The current model, as of 2018, is the SX-Aurora TSUBASA.

History
The first models, the SX-1 and SX-2, were announced in April 1983, and released in 1985. The SX-2 was the first computer to exceed 1 gigaflop. The SX-1 and SX-1E were less powerful models offered by NEC.

The SX-3 was announced in 1989, and shipped in 1990. The SX-3 allows parallel computing using both SIMD and MIMD. It also switched from the ACOS-4 based SX-OS, to the AT&T System V UNIX-based SUPER-UX operating system. In 1992 an improved variant, the SX-3R, was announced. A SX-3/44 variant was the fastest computer in the world between 1992-1993 on the TOP500 list. It had LSI integrated circuits with 20,000 gates per IC with a per-gate delay time of 70 picoseconds, could house 4 arithmetic processors with up to 4 sharing the same main memory, and up to several processors to achieve up to 22 GFLOPS of performance, with 1.37 GFLOPS of performance with a single processor. 100 LSI ICs were housed in a single multi chip module to achieve 2 million gates per module. The modules were watercooled.

The SX-4 series was announced in 1994, and first shipped in 1995. Since the SX-4, SX series supercomputers are constructed in a doubly parallel manner.  A number of central processing units (CPUs) are arranged into a parallel vector processing node.  These nodes are then installed in a regular SMP arrangement.

The SX-5 was announced and shipped in 1998, with the SX-6 following in 2001, and the SX-7 in 2002. Starting in 2001, Cray marketed the SX-5 and SX-6 exclusively in the US, and non-exclusively elsewhere for a short time.

The Earth Simulator, built from SX-6 nodes, was the fastest supercomputer from June 2002 to June 2004 on the LINPACK benchmark, achieving 35.86 TFLOPS. As of 2020, 3 Nvidia RTX 2080 Ti graphics cards can deliver comparable performance, at 14 TFLOPS per card.  The SX-9 was introduced in 2007 and discontinued in 2015. 

Tadashi Watanabe has been NEC's lead designer for the majority of SX supercomputer systems. For this work he received the Eckert–Mauchly Award in 1998 and the Seymour Cray Computer Engineering Award in 2006.

Hardware
Each system has multiple models, and the following table lists the most powerful variant of each system. Further certain systems have revisions, identified by a letter suffix.

Software environment

Operating system

The SX-1 and SX-2 ran the ACOS-4 based SX-OS. The SX-3 onwards run the SUPER-UX operating system (OS); the Earth Simulator runs a custom version of this OS.

Compilers
SUPER-UX comes with Fortran and C++ compilers. Cray has also developed an Ada compiler which is available as an option.

Software
Some vertical applications are available through NEC, but in general customers are expected to develop much of their own software. In addition to commercial applications, there is a wide body of free software for the UNIX environment which can be compiled and run on SUPER-UX, such as Emacs, and Vim. A port of GCC is also available for the platform.

SX-Aurora TSUBASA
The SX-Aurora TSUBASA PCIe card is running in a Linux machine, the Vector Host (VH), which provides operating system services to the Vector Engine (VE). The VE operating system VEOS runs in user space on the VH. Applications compiled for the VE can use almost all Linux system calls, they are transparently forwarded and executed on the VH. The components of VEOS are licensed under the GNU General Public License.

References

External links
NEC GLobal HPC
NEC Japan HPC
NEC Aurora Web Forums
NEC SX Vector Supercomputer

 
Vector supercomputers
64-bit computers